Citrus neocaledonica, synonym Oxanthera neocaledonica, the large leaf oxanthera, is a species of plant in the family Rutaceae. It is endemic to New Caledonia.

Taxonomy
Citrus neocaledonica was originally named as a member of the genus Citrus by André Guillaumin in 1911, but the false oranges were moved to a novel genus Oxanthera in the Swingle and Tanaka systems of citrus taxonomy. Phylogenetic analysis showed that Oxanthera species clustered within Citrus, which makes this species a member of that genus.

References

 

Endemic flora of New Caledonia
neocaledonica
Endangered plants
Taxonomy articles created by Polbot
Taxobox binomials not recognized by IUCN